Sariahtali is a village in Nalbari district, Assam, India. As per 2011 Census of India, Sariahtali has a population of 3,830 people with a literacy rate of 67.23%. The Government Industrial Training Institute (ITI), Nalbari is located in Sariahtali.

References 

Villages in Nalbari district